Shahad is a railway station on the Central line of the Mumbai Suburban Railway network, in western India. It is located on the route between Kalyan and Ambivli. 

Shahad is located on the Kasara Line, next to Kalyan. The railway route that comes up to Kalyan from Mumbai CST bifurcates, where one route goes towards Ambernath, Ulhasnagar Badlapur, Karjat, and Pune. The other line goes towards Shahad, Titwala, Asangaon, Kasara, and Nasik. Shahad is located on the Nasik route, next station from Kalyan.

Gallery

References

Railway stations in Thane district
Mumbai Suburban Railway stations
Mumbai CR railway division
Kalyan-Igatpuri rail line